Bomberman GB is a series of video games for the Game Boy created by Hudson Soft. The first entry in the series was Bomberman GB, released as Wario Blast: Featuring Bomberman! in North America and Europe, later succeeded by Bomberman GB 2, under the name Bomberman GB internationally, and Bomberman GB 3, which was only released in Japan.

Bomberman GB

 is the first game in the Bomberman GB series, developed and published by Hudson Soft in Japan, and published by Nintendo in North America and Europe under the name Wario Blast: Featuring Bomberman!. It was released on August 10, 1994 in Japan and later in November 1994 in North America, and on June 29, 1995 in Europe.

In Bomberman GB, White Bomberman is out riding on his motorcycle, when he is suddenly ambushed by Black Bomberman and his gang, who rough him up and steal all of his power-up items. Now White Bomberman must chase them down to get them back!

In Wario Blast: Featuring Bomberman!, Wario one day stumbles upon Bomberman's world, and, being the greedy sort he is, decides to loot it for his own gain. Bomberman is the only one that stands between Wario and the complete decimation of his world.

Every stage is viewed from an overhead perspective. The objective of the game is to blow up enemies to move on to the next stage. Gray walls can be blown up as well. Certain gray walls contain power-ups (which increase the power of explosions, or the number of bombs that can be set) and locate enemies. In Wario Blast, the player can play as either Wario or Bomberman, but this only changes the enemies from Black Bombermen to Wario clones, and back.

The game was enhanced for play on the SNES through the Super Game Boy. The enhanced game offered color graphics, custom explosion sounds, a multiplayer mode which allowed for simultaneous gameplay between up to four opponents, and in Wario Blast a special Wario & Bomberman frame around the TV screen. The game uses a password system to save progress, where the passwords for Wario are the same as for Bomberman, but written backwards.

Reception
GamePro criticized the game's graphics and difficult controls, but judged the game overall enjoyable due to its classic Bomberman elements, summarizing that "A legendary concept gets a great Nintendo treatment." Nintendo Power commented that the game was "great multi-player action." with "good use of Super Game Boy colors and music." and that the game had "larger areas than in previous Bomberman games." The reviews commented on the graphics stating it was "difficult to recognize your character" and that more characters would have helped.

Games World magazine gave the game an 86% score. Dave Perry said they "love Bomberman in this office" and the Game Boy port "is the perfect portable interpretation of" the game.

Bomberman GB 2

 is the second game in the Bomberman GB series, developed and published by Hudson Soft in Japan, published by Nintendo in North America and by Virgin Interactive in Europe. The game was released in Japan in 1995. Both North America and Europe released the game in 1998 as Bomberman GB, due to the previous game being released under the title Wario Blast: Featuring Bomberman!.

A Bomberman named Indy Bomber sets out on a long journey to uncover a legendary treasure called the Ring of Wishes. He discovers a scripture and begins reading it, but soon falls into a trap in the floor and ends up in a cave. Now he must find his way out of the cave and find the Ring of Wishes!

The main objective of the game is to defeat the enemies that lurk in the cave and find the exit when done. There are two modes that can be selected before each new stage; Mode A, which requires the player to simply destroy all the enemies, and Mode B, which requires the player to defeat the enemies in a certain order. When an area is cleared, the player earns a new ability to help them in later levels.

The game supports up to four players through use of the Game Link Cable and Super Multitap if used on a Super Game Boy.

Bomberman GB 3

 is the third and last game in the Bomberman GB series, developed and published by Hudson Soft. The game was released only in Japan on December 20, 1996.

Bomber Nebula's 11th planet, Owen, faces a sudden earthquake. Deep underground, the terrible Evil Bomber has been trapped for ages. He eventually breaks free and steals the Bomber Capsules, the energy that Bomberman relies on. Now he must take back the Capsules and defeat Evil Bomber!

The game's main objective is to defeat the enemies with bombs and unlock the exit to proceed to the next area. Each stage is divided into six areas, the last being a boss battle. The fifth area of each stage is to get crystals; if the player collects enough, a 1UP will be awarded along with two Bell Items that will spawn near the exit. These items will offer help to the player against the boss. A White Bomber will appear to drop items and a Black Bomber will appear to damage one HP to the boss.

After defeating a boss, they leave behind Bomber Capsules which can be used in Cutie Bomber's shop. There are 8 abilities to purchase, 4 of which are motorcycles. After purchasing one, the player can select them before each level, each granting additional HP and other abilities.

Other releases
Bomberman Collection is a Japanese only compilation released on July 21, 1996, developed and published by Hudson Soft. The game included the following titles: Bomber Boy (Released as Atomic Punk in North America and as Dynablaster in PAL regions), Bomberman GB (released as Wario Blast: Featuring Bomberman! internationally) and Bomberman GB 2 (released as Bomberman GB internationally).

Bomberman Selection is a Korean only compilation released for the Game Boy Color on April 30, 2003, developed by Hudson Soft and published by Jupiter. It included all of the titles from Bomberman Collection, minus Bomberman GB 2, and does not offer compatibility with the Super Game Boy.

Notes

References

External links
Bomberman GB - Hudson Game Navi at Hudson Soft (Japanese) on Wayback Machine
Bomberman GB 2 - Hudson Game Navi at Hudson Soft (Japanese) on Wayback Machine
Bomberman GB 3 - Hudson Game Navi at Hudson Soft (Japanese) on Wayback Machine
Bomberman Collection - Hudson Game Navi at Hudson Soft (Japanese) on Wayback Machine

Wario Blast at NinDB

1994 video games
1995 video games
1996 video games
Bomberman
Action video games
Crossover video games
Game Boy games
Game Boy-only games
Hudson Soft games
Maze games
Single-player video games
Video games developed in Japan
Virtual Console games
Wario video games